Renate Mann (20 May 1953 – 16 November 2021) was an Austrian politician.

Career
A member of the Social Democratic Party of Austria, she served in the Landtag of Upper Austria from 2008 to 2009 and was on the municipal council of Braunau am Inn from 1997 to 2021.

As a municipal councillor, she advocated for the construction of a women's shelter.

References

1953 births
2021 deaths
Austrian politicians
Social Democratic Party of Austria politicians
Members of the Landtag of Upper Austria
People from Braunau am Inn